Carl David "Winky" Smith (September 18, 1917 – January 9, 1967) was an ice hockey winger who played in seven games in the National Hockey League for the Detroit Red Wings in 1943. Smith picked up his nickname when he played on the same line as Ray Powell for the Omaha Knights following World War II. His brother Dalton "Nakina" Smith, played with him on many occasions throughout his career.

Professional career

Minor league hockey
Smith was small in size, but more than made up for it with his stellar play on the ice. After spending time with the St. Michael's Majors in the junior league of the Ontario Hockey Association he began play for the Oshawa G-Men of the senior league in the 1935–36 season. He continued to excel on the ice and was finally noticed after a stellar season in which he scored 30 points in just 18 games. Smith was contacted by the Detroit Red Wings on his birthday and signed as a free agent just nine days later. He was to begin play for the Wings in their farm system, starting with the Detroit Holzbaugh Ford of the Michigan-Ontario Hockey Association in the 1939–40 season. Smith averaged more than a point per game pace for the first 31 games of the season. Smith started the next season in the American Hockey Association with the first place St. Louis Flyers and playing for the first time with his brother, Dalton. Smith and his brother helped keep the Flyers in first place for the next two years, including helping them win the Harry F. Sinclair Trophy, given to the league champions, in 1940–41. For the 1942–43 season, Smith finally made the jump to the American Hockey League along with Dalton to begin play for the New Haven Eagles, but end the season playing for the Buffalo Bisons, all while scoring 38 points. He also helped lead the Bisons to win the AHL championship and the Calder Cup with his 9 playoff points.

Playing in the NHL
Finally in 1943, while having begun play for the Indianapolis Capitols (again reuniting with his brother), the Smith brothers were called up to play for the Detroit Red Wings of the National Hockey League. Carl contributed a goal and an assist in seven games, but still found himself back down in the minors. He finished out the season with the Capitols and ended up with another point per game season. In 1944–45, Smith again joined the St. Louis Flyers and ended with 10 goals and 26 assists.

For the 1945–46 season, Smith made the jump to the United States Hockey League (USHL), after a short stint with the Capitols again, and joined play for the Omaha Knights. He was an instant success scoring 29 goals and 67 points in 54 games to lead the team in scoring. He was named to the USHL First All-Star Team. He also scored in three goals in the Knights playoff run, losing to the Kansas City Pla-mors. The following season the Knights acquired Nelson Boyce who would befriend Smith and form a strong scoring duo that would stay together for the next two years. They spent so much time together, the pair became known as Blinky and Winky to teammates and fans. After two more successful seasons with the Knights, and two more postseason losses to the Pla-mors, Smith decided to retire from playing ice hockey at the end of the 1948–49 season.

Career statistics

Regular season and playoffs

Awards and achievements
Harry F. Sinclair Trophy winner (AHA Champion) – St. Louis Flyers (1940–41)
Calder Cup winner (AHL Champion) – Buffalo Bisons (1942–43)
USHL First All-Star Team (1946)

References

External links

1917 births
1967 deaths
Buffalo Bisons (AHL) players
Canadian expatriate ice hockey players in the United States
Canadian ice hockey forwards
Detroit Red Wings players
Ice hockey people from Ontario
Indianapolis Capitals players
Omaha Knights (USHL) players
Ontario Hockey Association Senior A League (1890–1979) players
Oshawa Generals players
People from West Nipissing
St. Louis Flyers players
St. Louis Flyers (AHA) players
Toronto St. Michael's Majors players
Canadian emigrants to the United States